TER Hauts-de-France is the regional rail network serving the French administrative region of Hauts-de-France in northern France. It is owned and operated by the French national railway company SNCF. It was formed in 2017 from the previous TER networks TER Nord-Pas-de-Calais and TER Picardie, after the respective administrative regions were merged.

Network

Four types of services are distinguished by TER Hauts-de-France:
Krono+ GV: fast connections, including high speed lines
Krono: fast connections between cities
Citi: frequent suburban services
Proxi: local services
To which summer seasonal (saisonnières) services are added, under the auspices of "éTER" operations.

The rail and bus network as of April 2021:

Rail

Bus

See also

Réseau Ferré de France
List of SNCF stations in Hauts-de-France

References

 
Rail transport in Hauts-de-France